Djur-djur ( — water-water;  — «onomatopoeia to the falling water») — waterfall is located on the Ulu-Uzen'  river in the Crimean Mountains of Crimea.
Djur-djur has not dried up ever, even in the dry years. Water from the waterfall falls into a small lake, and then comes into the river channel, which flows into the sea near the village Solnechnogorsk.

Waterfall name 

The name of the waterfall «Murmurous», named as onomatopoeia running water. According to one version the name originates from Armenian language «djur» (Ջուր) (literally — "water-water"). 
According to another of Iranian languages «Djur» — a murmur of running water.

Gallery

See also
 Waterfalls of Ukraine

References

External links
 www.travelwestukraine.net

Waterfalls of Crimea